DEMOS (Dialogovaya Edinaya Mobilnaya Operatsionnaya Sistema) is a Unix-like operating system developed in the Soviet Union. It is derived from Berkeley Software Distribution (BSD) Unix.

Development 

DEMOS's development was initiated in the Kurchatov Institute of Atomic Energy in Moscow in 1982, and development continued in cooperation from other institutes, and commercialized by DEMOS Co-operative which employed most key contributors to DEMOS and to its earlier alternative, MNOS (a clone of Version 6 Unix). MNOS and DEMOS version 1.x were gradually merged from 1986 until 1990, leaving the joint OS, DEMOS version 2.x, with support for different Cyrillic script character encoding (charsets) (KOI-8 and U-code, used in DEMOS 1 and MNOS, respectively).

Initially it was developed for SM-4 (a PDP-11/40 clone) and SM-1600. Later it was ported to Elektronika-1082, BESM, ES EVM, clones of VAX-11 (SM-1700), and several other platforms, including PC/XT, Elektronika-85 (a clone of DEC Professional), and several Motorola 68020-based microcomputers.

The development of DEMOS effectively ceased in 1991, when the second project of the DEMOS team, RELCOM, took priority.

The originally suggested name was УНАС (UNAS), which is a volapukish word play on Unix; "у них" ("u nih") in Russian means "with them", "у нас" ("u nas") means "with us". Management dismissed this idea in favor of a traditional alphabet soup.

References 
 Mapping Russian Cyberspace — Rafal Rohozinski, United Nations Research Institute for Social Development, 1999
 astr0baby.wordpress.com/2016/10/17/soviet-unix-clone-demos/
 https://www.opendemocracy.net/en/odr/usenet-coup/

See also 
 MNOS (operating system)
 MOS (operating system)
 RELCOM

Computing in the Soviet Union
Soviet inventions
Berkeley Software Distribution